The 10th Guam Legislature was a meeting of the Guam Legislature. It convened in Hagatna, Guam on January 6, 1969 and ended on January 4, 1971.

In the 1968 Guamanian general election, the Democratic Party of Guam won all twenty-one seats in the Guam Legislature.

Party Summary

Membership

References 

Politics of Guam
Political organizations based in Guam
Legislature of Guam